Colfax Township may refer to the following places in the United States:

 Colfax Township, Champaign County, Illinois
 Colfax Township, Newton County, Indiana
 Colfax Township, Boone County, Iowa
 Colfax Township, Grundy County, Iowa
 Colfax Township, Cloud County, Kansas
 Colfax Township, Marion County, Kansas
 Colfax Township, Wilson County, Kansas
 Colfax Township, Benzie County, Michigan
 Colfax Township, Huron County, Michigan
 Colfax Township, Mecosta County, Michigan
 Colfax Township, Oceana County, Michigan
 Colfax Township, Wexford County, Michigan
 Colfax Township, Minnesota
 Colfax Township, Atchison County, Missouri

Township name disambiguation pages